Stephen McCann (born 31 May 1958) is a former Australian rules footballer who played for North Melbourne in the Victorian Football League (VFL) during the 1980s. He was a key position player and ruckman for the Kangaroos and a premiership player in 1977.

External links

1958 births
North Melbourne Football Club players
North Melbourne Football Club Premiership players
All-Australians (1953–1988)
Living people
Australian rules footballers from Geraldton
Victorian State of Origin players
One-time VFL/AFL Premiership players